This is a list of things named after Joseph Fourier:

Mathematics
Budan–Fourier theorem, see Budan's theorem
Fourier's theorem
Fourier–Motzkin elimination
Fourier algebra 
Fourier division
Fourier method

Analysis
Fourier analysis
Fourier series
Fourier–Bessel series
Fourier sine and cosine series
Generalized Fourier series
Laplace–Fourier series, see Laplace series
Fourier–Legendre series
Fourier transform (List of Fourier-related transforms):
Discrete-time Fourier transform (DTFT), the reverse of the Fourier series, a special case of the Z-transform around the unit circle in the complex plane
Discrete Fourier transform (DFT), occasionally called the finite Fourier transform, the Fourier transform of a discrete periodic sequence (yielding discrete periodic frequencies), which can also be thought of as the DTFT of a finite-length sequence evaluated at discrete frequencies
Fast Fourier transform (FFT), a fast algorithm for computing a Discrete Fourier transform
Finite Fourier transform
Fractional Fourier transform (FRFT), a linear transformation generalizing the Fourier transform, used in the area of harmonic analysis
Fourier–Deligne transform 
Fourier–Mukai transform
Fourier inversion theorem
Fourier integral theorem

In physics and engineering
Fourier's law of heat conduction
Fourier number (also known as the Fourier modulus), a ratio  of the rate of heat conduction  to the rate of thermal energy storage 
Fourier optics
Fourier-transform spectroscopy, a measurement technique whereby spectra are collected based on measurements of the temporal coherence of a radiative source

Other
Joseph Fourier University 
10101 Fourier

See also
Fourier (disambiguation)

List of Fourier-related transforms
List of Fourier analysis topics

Fourier
Joseph Fourier